The abyssal halosaur (Halosauropsis macrochir) is a species of bottom-dwelling, deep-sea fish in the family Halosauridae that is found in all oceans at depths of 1100 to 3500 meters. It is the only member of its genus.

Berstad et al. could not sex fish smaller than 25 cm, giving an indication about length at maturation. Abyssal halosaur are long-lived, with maximum reported age of 36 years, although individuals sampled on the Mid-Atlantic Ridge were mostly <20 years. It appears to be an opportunistic feeder, mostly taking epibenthos and small fish.

References

Halosauridae
Deep sea fish
Fish described in 1878
Taxa named by Albert Günther